Thoughts of a Colored Man is a play written by Keenan Scott II that opened on Broadway on October 13, 2021. It is Scott's Broadway debut, and the play is the first Broadway show that was written  and directed by Black men (Steve Broadnax III) with a Black man in the lead role. It was slated to be one of seven plays by Black playwrights during the Fall 2021 season. The show uses slam poetry, prose and songs to tell the story of Black life in America through the stories of seven multi generational men living in the same Brooklyn neighborhood.

The show ran at the Golden Theatre until December 22, 2021, when it was forced to close due to the COVID-19 pandemic, even though the playwright stepped in to cover one performance. It was originally slated to end March 2022.

Scott began working on what is now Thoughts of a Colored Man fifteen years earlier when he was a Frostburg State University student. Prior to its Broadway engagement, the show had an out-of-town tryout at Syracuse Stage and Baltimore Center Stage. A December performance of the show was recorded for preservation in the New York Public Library Theatre on Film and Tape Archive.

References

External links

Broadway plays
2021 plays